Waiting is a 1991 Australian film directed by Jackie McKimmie and starring Noni Hazlehurst, Deborra-Lee Furness, and Fiona Press.

Premise
Friends meet at a farm house to await the birth of a baby.

Cast
Noni Hazlehurst as Clare
Deborra-Lee Furness as Diane
Frank Whitten as Michael
Helen Jones as Sandy
Denis Moore as Bill
Fiona Press as Therese
Ray Barrett as Frank
Noga Bernstein as Rosie
Peter Tu Tran as Tan
Brian Simpson as Booroomil
Matthew Fargher as Steve

Box office
Waiting grossed $185,600 at the box office in Australia.

Reception
At the AFI Awards Fiona Press won the Best Actress in a Supporting Role award and the film was nominated in 4 other categories. Jackie McKimmie was awarded the OCIC Award – Honorable Mention in the Venice Film Festival.

See also
Cinema of Australia

References

Further reading

External links

Waiting at Oz Movies

1991 films
Australian drama films
1990s English-language films
1991 drama films
1990s Australian films